Edward Cator Seaton (1815 – 21 January 1880) was an English doctor who became the second Chief Medical Officer of the United Kingdom.

Life
Seaton studied medicine at the University of Edinburgh and moved to London in 1841. He made his professional reputation with a report on vaccination against smallpox for the Epidemiological Society of London which was presented to Parliament in 1852. He was then appointed as the vaccination inspector under the 1853 Vaccination Act by John Simon. When Simon resigned in 1876, he was appointed Chief Medical Officer.

He is buried at Kensal Green Cemetery, London.

References

Further reading

1815 births
1880 deaths
19th-century English medical doctors
Alumni of the University of Edinburgh
Burials at Kensal Green Cemetery
Chief Medical Officers for England
Vaccination advocates